Stolyarenko is a  Ukrainian-language surname derived from the occupation of  stolyar, or "carpenter", "cabinetmaker", "joiner", literally meaning "son of carpenter". Notable people with this surname include:

Aleksandr Stolyarenko (born 1991), Russian footballer
Julija Stoliarenko (born 1993), Lithuanian mixed martial artist
Vladimir Stolyarenko (born 1961), Russian banker

See also
 

Ukrainian-language surnames
Occupational surnames
Patronymic surnames